São João da Boa Vista ("Saint John of the Good View" in English) is a municipality in the state of São Paulo, Brazil.

The foundation history
The city was founded on June 24, 1824 In the beginning of last century, a group of miners decided to rest at the edge of Jaguari Mirim River, already in São Paulo state, and got astonished by the exuberant view of the nature. They got so delighted that on that Saint John's day, the miners started up the construction of the town and, to celebrate the Saint of that day as well as because of the amazing twilights at the sunset, the city was named São João da Boa Vista. Only 14 years later, the town was claimed a district. On March 24, 1859 it became a city, and on February 7, 1885 it was considered a judicial district, offering its citizens all the basic infrastructure.

Demographics
São João da Boa Vista possesses, according to IBGE 2010, 83,661 inhabitants.

Notable people
Roger Abdelmassih - former doctor accused of  sexual assault against 52 women
Nenê Bonilha - football player
Glenn McMillan - actor and lawyer
Mariana Morais - MMA featherweight fighter
Guiomar Novaes - famous piano player

References

 
Populated places established in 1821
1821 establishments in Brazil